Archibald "Archie" McWhinnie (17 July 1926 – 21 March 1971) was a Scottish professional footballer, who made two appearances in the English football league with Wrexham.

He also played for Scottish clubs Rutherglen Glencairn and Cowdenbeath.

References

1926 births
1971 deaths
Rutherglen Glencairn F.C. players
Wrexham A.F.C. players
Cowdenbeath F.C. players
Scottish footballers
Association football wing halves
English Football League players